In electroencephalography, the P50 is an event related potential occurring approximately 50 ms after the presentation of a stimulus, usually an auditory click. The P50 response is used to measure sensory gating, or the reduced neurophysiological response to redundant stimuli.

Research has found an abnormal P50 suppression in people with schizophrenia, making it an example of a biological marker for the disorder. Besides schizophrenia, abnormal P50 suppression has been found in patients with traumatic brain injury, recreational drug use, and post-traumatic stress disorder.

Paired click test
In a paired click test, one auditory click sound will be presented, followed by a second click approximately 500 ms after the first one. The second sound is considered redundant, and so a typical control showing normal sensory gating will produce a reduced response (in wave amplitude) to the second click. The suppression is measured as the percentage of amplitude decrease in response to the second click compared to the first click, with typical controls showing an approximately 80% decrease to the second stimulus. This response is recorded at the scalp and represents a pre-attentive process of sensory gating.

Development
Healthy infants as young as 1 to 4 months old were found to demonstrate a P50 suppression in a paired click task, suggesting that sensory gating is present early in development.

Suppression deficits in individuals with schizophrenia
Studies have found that patients with schizophrenia fail to show a reduced response to the second click. Abnormal sensory gating may be behind symptoms of schizophrenia such as sensory overload and difficulty concentrating.

A link exists between abnormal α7 receptors and the abnormal P50 response.

In a family that has a child with schizophrenia, at least one of the parents tends to show higher rates of abnormal P50 gating compared to normal controls even when the parents themselves do not have schizophrenia.

Abnormal P50 suppression in paired click tests can be found through either a failure to suppress the second stimulus, or as a failure to produce a heightened response to the first stimulus. Some studies suggest that P50 suppression in people with schizophrenia might instead appear as a smaller response to the first auditory stimulus.

See also
 Endophenotype
 Prepulse inhibition
 Startle response
 P300 (neuroscience)

References

Electroencephalography
Evoked potentials
Mental disorders screening and assessment tools